Ter Horst is a Dutch toponymic surname. The original bearer of the name was from the horst, which is a historical indication of raised terrain covered with shrubs.
People with the name include:

Guusje ter Horst (b. 1952), Dutch politician and government minister
Kate ter Horst (1906–1992), a.k.a. Angel of Arnhem, Dutch woman who tended wounded soldiers during the Battle of Arnhem
Olivier ter Horst (b. 1989), Dutch professional football player
Rachel Ter Horst (b. 1973), Dutch model
Enrique ter Horst (b. 1952), Venezuelan diplomat
Jerald terHorst (1922–2010), press secretary to President Gerald Ford

See also
Van der Horst, Dutch surname

Dutch-language surnames